Fernanda Demétrio Decnop Coelho (Niterói, June 19, 1987) is a Brazilian sailor. She won the bronze medal in the women's Laser Radial event at the 2015 Pan American Games. She placed 24th in the Laser Radial event at the 2016 Summer Olympics. Decnop is also a certified veterinarian, having attended the 2016 Summer Paralympics tending the horse of Alfonsina Maldonado, and sings in a progressive metal band.

References

1987 births
Living people
Sportspeople from Niterói
Brazilian female sailors (sport)
Olympic sailors of Brazil
Sailors at the 2016 Summer Olympics – Laser Radial
Sailors at the 2015 Pan American Games
Pan American Games bronze medalists for Brazil
Pan American Games medalists in sailing
Medalists at the 2015 Pan American Games